Coleophora obducta is a moth of the family Coleophoridae. It is found in Japan and Russia (Baikal).

Adults have a grey head, thorax, legs and abdomen. The forewings are dark grey with a faint coppery gloss. The hindwings are grey to dark grey.

The larvae feed on Larix leptolepis and Larix gmelinii. They feed on the conifer needles of their host plant.

References

obducta
Moths described in 1931
Moths of Japan
Moths of Asia